The 1999 Welwyn Hatfield District Council election took place on 6 May 1999 to elect members of Welwyn Hatfield District Council in Hertfordshire, England. The whole council was up for election with boundary changes since the last election in 1998 increasing the number of seats by one. The Conservative party gained overall control of the council from the Labour party. Overall turnout in the election was 33.09%.

After the election, the composition of the council was
Conservative 24
Labour 21
Vacant 3

Election result

References

1999
1999 English local elections
1990s in Hertfordshire